Jonathan Phillips may refer to:

 Sir Jonathan Phillips (civil servant) (born 1952), retired British civil servant
 Jonathan Phillips (ice hockey)
 Jonny Phillips (actor) (born 1963), English actor